Gerd Heßler (born 13 September 1948 in Tannenbergsthal) is a former East German cross-country skier who competed in the 1970s. He earned two medals in the 4 x 10 km at the FIS Nordic World Ski Championships with a gold (1974) and a silver (1970).

Hessler was also part of the 4 x 10 km relay team that finished 6th at the 1972 Winter Olympics in Sapporo. He was at some stage married to the cross country skier Monika Debertshäuser.

References

External links
World Championship results 

1948 births
Living people
German male cross-country skiers
Olympic cross-country skiers of East Germany
Cross-country skiers at the 1972 Winter Olympics
Cross-country skiers at the 1976 Winter Olympics
FIS Nordic World Ski Championships medalists in cross-country skiing
People from Vogtlandkreis
Sportspeople from Saxony